Cyphoma macumba is a species of sea snail, a marine gastropod mollusk in the family Ovulidae, the ovulids, cowry allies or false cowries.

This species has become an (uncertain) synonym of Cyphoma gibbosum (Linnaeus, 1758)

Distribution
Endemic to Brazil - from Ceará to Rio de Janeiro State (belonged to the Bahian Subprovince, including Abrolhos archipelago, according to Petuchi, 2013).

Description 
The maximum recorded shell length is 32.5 mm.

Habitat 
Minimum recorded depth is 2 m. Maximum recorded depth is 10 m.

References

External links

Ovulidae
Gastropods described in 1979